Quast is a German surname. Notable people with the surname include:

Anne Quast (born 1937), American amateur golfer
Brad Quast (born 1968), All-conference football player
Ferdinand von Quast (1850–1939), Prussian military officer, participant in the Franco-Prussian War and a general in the First World War
Harry Quast (born 1991), American professional ice hockey defenceman
Jan Quast (born 1970), Boxer from Germany
John Quast (1900–1966), American football end 
Matthijs Quast (died 1641), Dutch explorer 
Pieter Quast (1605-06–1647), Dutch Golden Age painter and draughtsman
Philip Quast (born 1957), Australian actor and singer
Marc Quast (born 1997), German pro esports player

References

German-language surnames